Chinese folk art are artistic forms inherited from a regional or ethnic scene in China.  Usually there are some variation between provinces.  Individual folk arts have a long history, and many traditions are still practiced today.  The general definition of folk art incorporates Chinese art forms that are not classified as Chinese fine art.

Chinese Folk art is the ancient forms of art that originated in China. Some of these ancient art forms include jade carvings, performance art such as music and their respective instruments, textile art such as basket weaving, paper art and clothing.

Jade Carving 
Jade is a semi-rare green mineral. This mineral is prominently found in Chinese art. Due to the toughness of Jade, It is believed that Chinese Jade Carvings were first carved into weapons such as swords, it is unclear if the sword carvings were used for ceremonial or utilitarian use. As time went on Jade was carved into many different shapes and forms, an example of a Jade Carving is a circular disk which is usually used as a ritual function. By 3,000 BC Jade was referred to “yu” which means “the royal gem”. By 206 BC Xu Shen a Chinese Scholar during the Han Period listed the Five Virtues of Jade; they are: Benevolence, Honesty, Wisdom, Integrity, and Bravery. Unlike gold, diamonds, pearls Jade is considered priceless in China. Jade is extremely difficult to form hence why the mineral is so expensive. Jade is a precious gemstone that in the Chinese culture represents love, strength, purity, luck, and gentleness. Jade is also used in the ancient art of Feng Shui in China. Jade in the aspect of Feng Shui adds an element of harmony and balance to the space the jade is placed in. Carvings using jade was a common folk art in China. From objects such as masks to animals, jade - along with bamboo and wood - was used to craft many
works of art. It is believed that Chinese Jade Carvings were first carved into weapons such as swords, it is unclear if the sword carvings were used for ceremonial or utilitarian use. As time went on Jade was carved into many different shapes and forms, an example of a Jade Carving is a circular disk which is usually used as a ritual function.

Basket weaving
Baskets are mainly woven with bamboo or plant stems.

Chinese kites
China is the birthplace of the kite, and Weifang is one of the chief places where Chinese kites originated. Kite-flying became prevalent in Weifang in the Song dynasty (960–1279).  By the Ming dynasty (1368–1644) kite-flying had become even more popular, and kite fairs on a rather large scale had appeared.  Kites were sold not only across Shandong, but also to Jiangsu, Fujian, Anhui and other places. The noted English scholar Joseph Needham listed kites in his book History of Science and Technology in China as one of the important contributions in science and technology that the Chinese introduced to Europe.

Food art

Sugar

Sugar painting (Simp. 糖画, Trad. 糖畫 -Tánghuà)is a form of traditional Chinese folk art using hot, liquid sugar to create two dimensional objects on a marble or metal surface.

Sugar people (糖人) is a traditional Chinese form of folk art using hot, liquid sugar to create three-dimensional figures.

Flour figures

Mian Ren (Flour Figure) are made of coloured flours. Craftsmen used to travel with their tools to villages and towns to make and sell flour figures for a very basic income. Sometimes flour figures are used in dishes together with vegetable carvings.

Paper art

The first two forms of paper art began in the Han dynasty with Chinese paper cutting and Chinese paper folding, together with the hand fan and pinwheel (toy).

Chinese paper-cutting, or jianzhi, (剪纸) is a type of folk art that has roots in China during the 6th century and is attributed to Cai-Lun during the Han Dynasty. 

Known to be very intricate with the use of negative space, jianzhi is used for mostly decorative reasons, appearing on mirrors, lanterns, walls, etc. 

In most cities and Chinatowns, paper art will adorn many street corners, business fronts, and inside buildings.

Performances

Puppetry
One of the oldest forms of folk art is puppetry. Puppeteers use various kinds of puppets, including marionettes, glove puppets, rod puppets, cloth puppets and wire puppets in performances incorporating folk songs and dances over some dialogues. The subject matter is derived mainly from children's stories and fables.

Shadow play
Chinese shadow theatre is a form of puppetry that is performed by moving figures made of animal skins or cardboard held behind a screen lit by lamplight. The subject matter and singing style in shadow plays are closely related to Chinese opera, except without using live actors or actresses. Chinese shadow theatre is a form of puppetry that is performed by moving figures made of animal skins or cardboard held behind a screen lit by lamplight. This art style was passed down in a Master-Apprentice style until recently. The most common troupe roster is one puppeteer, singer and musicians  whose subject matter and singing style in shadow plays are closely related to Chinese opera, except without using live actors or actresses. Shadow puppetry was banned by the government in 1966 during the cultural revolution, but puppetry was allowed back in the late 1970s.

Textile arts

Chinese knot

Chinese knotting (中國結) is a decorative handicraft art that began as a form of Chinese folk art in the Tang and Song dynasty (960–1279 AD) in China. It was later popularized in the Ming. The art is also referred to as Chinese traditional decorative knots. One of the more traditional art forms, it creates decorative knot patterns. During the Culture revolution it was not practiced, but nowadays it is very popular again.

In other cultures, it is known simply as "decorative knot".

Tiger-head shoes
Tiger-head shoes (虎头鞋) are an example of traditional Chinese folk handicraft used as footwear for children. Their name comes from the toe cap, which looks like the head of a tiger.

Musical instruments

Bolang gu, a traditional Chinese pellet drum and toy.

Muyu, a rounded woodblock carved in the shape of a fish, it is played by striking the top with a wooden stick; often used in Buddhist chanting.

See also
 Chinese art
 Chinese fine art
 Chinese games
 Culture of China
 Chinese folk art

References

Bibliography
 Chang, Zonglin. Li, Xukui. (2006). Aspect of Chinese culture. 中国文化导读. 清华大学出版社 publishing

 
Folk art